Chen Liansheng (Chinese: 陈连晟; Pinyin: Chén Liánshèng, born 21 February 1991) is a Chinese football player who currently plays for China League Two side Jilin Baijia.

Club career
Chen started his professional football career in 2010 when he was promoted to Chinese Super League side Changchun Yatai's first team. He didn't play for the club until 23 June 2012. He made his senior debut against Hangzhou Greentown, coming on as a substitute for Zhang Wenzhao in the 84th minute. He scored his first goal in the 88th minute which ensured Changchun beat Hangzhou 3–2. His first senior start came on 4 days later, playing against Hohhot Dongjin in the third round of 2012 Chinese FA Cup. He assisted Marko Ljubinković's first goal in the 40th minute. Chen played 4 league matches (all coming off the bench) in the 2012 league season.

On 8 July 2014, Chen was loaned to China League Two side Jiangxi Liansheng until 31 December 2014.

In February 2018, Chen transferred to China League Two side Jilin Baijia.

Career statistics
Statistics accurate as of match played 12 October 2019.

References

Living people
1991 births
Chinese footballers
Footballers from Dalian
Changchun Yatai F.C. players
Jiangxi Beidamen F.C. players
Chinese Super League players
Association football midfielders